Beatin' the Odds may refer to:
Beatin' the Odds (Molly Hatchet album), 1980
Beatin' the Odds (Eddie Rabbitt album), 1997